David Edwin Keefe (January 9, 1897 – February 4, 1978) was an American professional baseball pitcher, coach and front-office official.

Keefe's playing career lasted from 1917 through 1932, missing the 1918 campaign while serving in the United States Navy during World War I. In 97 MLB games pitched, 27 as a starting pitcher, he won nine games, lost 17, and posted 12 complete games, one shutout, two saves (not then an official statistic), and an earned run average of 4.15. He permitted 403 hits and 113 bases on balls, with 126 strikeouts, in 353 innings pitched.

Keefe returned to the Major Leagues as a batting practice pitcher for the Athletics in the early 1930s and was listed as a full-time coach under Baseball Hall of Fame manager Connie Mack for eight seasons (–).  He then served as the club's traveling secretary (1951–1960) in both Philadelphia and Kansas City, where the Athletics moved in 1955. He died, at age 81, in Kansas City after a fire struck his apartment building and he was overcome when trying to rescue another elderly resident.

References

External links

1897 births
1978 deaths
Accidental deaths in Missouri
United States Navy personnel of World War I
Baseball coaches from Vermont
Baseball players from Vermont
Buffalo Bisons (minor league) players
Cleveland Indians players
Harrisburg Islanders players
Hartford Senators players
Knoxville Smokies players
Major League Baseball pitchers
Memphis Chickasaws players
Milwaukee Brewers (minor league) players
Norfolk Tars players
People from Williston, Vermont
Philadelphia Athletics coaches
Philadelphia Athletics players
Portland Beavers players
Providence Grays (minor league) players
Reading Coal Barons players
Sacramento Senators players
Waterbury Brasscos players
Wilkes-Barre Barons (baseball) players